This is a list of episodes from the eleventh season of Hawaii Five-O.

Broadcast history
The season originally aired Thursdays at 9:00-10:00 pm (EST).

DVD release
The season was released on DVD by Paramount Home Video.

Episodes

References

11
1978 American television seasons
1979 American television seasons